General transcription factor 3C polypeptide 2 is a protein that in humans is encoded by the GTF3C2 gene.

Interactions 

GTF3C2 has been shown to interact with GTF3C4 and GTF3C5.

References

Further reading

External links 
 
 

Transcription factors